Scream Bloody Gore is the first studio album by American death metal band Death, released on May 25, 1987, by Combat Records. It is considered by many to be "the first true death metal record". Chuck Schuldiner, the band’s founder and leader, performed guitar, bass and vocals, and composed all tracks on the album.

John Hand is noted in the album's credits as playing rhythm guitar, though this was incorrect and Hand was only in the band for a short period and never performed or recorded on the album. This is also the only Death album to feature drummer Chris Reifert, who had joined for the Mutilation demo, and the only one of the band's albums to not be recorded at Morrisound Recording.

Perseverance Holdings, Ltd. and Relapse Records reissued the album on May 20, 2016, on CD, vinyl, and cassette. The album was remastered for this release, and also included the original Florida session as well as recordings of rehearsals performed in 1986.

Overview
The album was actually recorded twice, with the second Los Angeles-based session being released as the complete album by label Combat Records (later Relativity). It was first recorded in Florida, although only the rhythm guitar and drum tracks were recorded. The track listing consisted of "Torn to Pieces", "Legion of Doom", "Scream Bloody Gore", "Sacrificial Cunt" (later shortened to "Sacrificial" because the label asked the band to do so, possibly because "they didn't want to get P.M.R.C. on their case"), "Mutilation", "Land of No Return", and "Baptized in Blood". The label were unsatisfied after hearing the initial mix, so Schuldiner and Reifert re-recorded the album in California with Randy Burns as producer. Once returning to Florida, the first session was released as a promotional tape, and was eventually bootlegged. "Legion of Doom" was a longtime staple of Death's rehearsals and live shows, and was indeed the first song written, reaching back to when they were known as Mantas.

Despite the many songs written during Death's demo days, only half of them were re-recorded for the album, the rest being new compositions. "Infernal Death" and "Baptized in Blood" originally appeared on the Infernal Death demo. "Mutilation" originally appeared on the "Back from the Dead" demo. "Zombie Ritual" and "Land of No Return" originally appeared on the Mutilation demo, and "Evil Dead" and "Beyond the Unholy Grave" were originally on Death By Metal. "Beyond the Unholy Grave" and "Land of No Return" were also cut from the vinyl and cassette versions of the album, though were included as CD-only  bonus  tracks and on subsequent re-releases in other formats, along with two live audio tracks taken from the Ultimate Revenge II video.

Certain songs on the album were inspired by horror movies. "Regurgitated Guts" was inspired by the 1980 film City of the Living Dead (a.k.a. The Gates of Hell), "Beyond the Unholy Grave" was influenced by the 1981 film The Beyond, and "Zombie Ritual" was inspired by the 1979 film Zombie, all of which were directed by Italian director Lucio Fulci. "Evil Dead" was named after the film of the same name, while other tracks such as the title track and "Torn to Pieces" were inspired by Re-Animator and Make Them Die Slowly, respectively.

Reception and legacy

Scream Bloody Gore is often considered the first death metal album. Although some critics consider Seven Churches by Possessed to be the first death metal record, Eduardo Rivadavia of AllMusic writes that, "Seven Churches was a transition between thrash metal and death metal, while Scream Bloody Gore defined the core elements of death metal". According to music journalist Joel McIver, Death's debut album was a "turning-point in extreme metal", and qualified it as "the first true death metal album". Canadian journalist Martin Popoff indicated Schuldiner as the musician who introduced "a new level of convolution that will mark the beginnings of the next stage in extreme." Writer Ian Christe stated in Sound of the Beast: The Complete Headbanging History of Heavy Metal that "Scream Bloody Gore emulated hardcore punk. It also evoked the dark moods of horror sound tracks from the drive-in zombie and cannibal horror films of George Romero". Metal Forces described the album as "death metal at its utmost extreme, brutal, raw and offensive – the kind that separates the true death metallers from countless trend-following wimps".

Brazilian thrash metal band Sepultura covered "Zombie Ritual" as a bonus track for their 2013 album The Mediator Between Head and Hands Must Be the Heart.

Power metal band DragonForce covered "Evil Dead" as a bonus track from their 2017 album Reaching into Infinity. It was also covered by the Norwegian black metal band Mayhem for the vinyl bonus disc of their 2019 album Daemon.

Track listings
All tracks written by Chuck Schuldiner.

Personnel
 Chuck Schuldiner – vocals, guitar, bass
 Chris Reifert – drums
 John Hand – credited on the album as rhythm guitar but did not perform on album or during any live performances
 Randy Burns – percussion, producer
 Edward Repka – design, illustration

Charts

References

Death (metal band) albums
1987 debut albums
Albums with cover art by Ed Repka
Combat Records albums